Samarpit Joshi (born 19 September 1999) is an Indian cricketer. He made his List A debut on 1 March 2021, for Rajasthan in the 2020–21 Vijay Hazare Trophy. He made his first-class debut on 3 March 2022, for Rajasthan in the 2021–22 Ranji Trophy.

References

External links
 

1999 births
Living people
Indian cricketers
Rajasthan cricketers
Place of birth missing (living people)